Rollie is a nickname, often for Roland or Rolland, and occasionally a given name which may refer to:

Rolands
 Rollie Boutin (born 1957), Canadian retired ice hockey goaltender
 Rollie Cook (born 1952), Canadian politician
 Rollie Dotsch (1933-1988), American professional football coach
 Rollie Fingers (born 1946), American retired Major League Baseball Hall-of-Fame pitcher
 Granville Roland Fortescue (1875-1952), American soldier, presidential aide (to cousin Theodore Roosevelt), journalist and war correspondent
 Rollie Free (1900-1984), American motorcycle racer who broke the American former land speed record in 1948
 Rollie Massimino (born 1934), American college basketball coach and former player
 Roland McLenahan (1921-1984), Canadian National Hockey League player
 Roland Melanson (born 1960), Canadian retired ice hockey goaltender and coach, nicknamed "Rollie the goalie"
 Rollie Miles (1927-1995), Canadian Football League player
 Roland Paulhus (1901-1964), Canadian National Hockey League player
 Roland Pemberton (born 1986), Canadian rapper under the stage name Cadence Weapon
 Felix Rossignol (1920-1981), Canadian ice hockey player
 Rollie Sheldon (born 1936), American retired Major League Baseball pitcher
 Roland “Rollie” Page Dimick (born 1969), American, Pediatrician, artist, philosopher, designer, entrepreneur.

Rollands
 Rolland Busch (1920-1985), Australian theologian and Presbyterian and Uniting Church minister
 Rollie Greeno (1926-2010), American college football coach
 Rolland W. Redlin (1920-2011), American politician
 Rollie Seltz (born 1924), American retired basketball player who played in the National Basketball Association's first season
 Rollie Stiles (1906-2007), American Major League Baseball pitcher
 Rollie Williams (1897-1968), American National Football League player in 1923 and college basketball and football coach

Presumed given name
 Rollie Cook (Canadian football) (born c. 1936), former Canadian Football League player
 Rollie Zeider (1883-1967), American Major League Baseball player

Other
 Stratton Rollins Rollie Heath (born 1937), American politician, Democratic Majority Leader of the Colorado State Senate
 Ralston Rollie Hemsley (1907-1972), American Major League Baseball catcher
 Roleine Rollie Naylor (1892-1966), American Major League Baseball pitcher
 Rollin Prather (1925-1996), Canadian Football League player
 Rollie Lynn Riggs (1899-1954), American author, poet and playwright

Fictional characters
 Roland Tyler, protagonist of the films F/X and F/X2, played by Bryan Brown

See also
 Rolly (disambiguation)

Masculine given names
Hypocorisms